Samuele Parlati (born 5 February 1997) is an Italian professional footballer who plays as a midfielder for  club Monterosi.

In February 2023, during a Serie C game against Giugliano, he became one of the few outfield players to ever have saved a penalty kick while playing in goal.

Club career

Early career and Ascoli 
Born in Gallipoli, Parlati started his playing career at local clubs Taviano and Gallipoli, before entering the youth sector of Lecce in 2011, and then joining Ascoli in 2015. The following year, he took part with Ascoli's under-19 squad in the Torneo di Viareggio.

Paganese (loan) 
After signing a pre-contract with Ascoli, in August 2016 Parlati was sent out on a season-long loan to Lega Pro side Paganese. He made his league debut for the club on 4 September 2016, starting in a 2–1 loss to Matera. On 19 April 2017, he scored his first professional goal, coming off the bench and rounding up a 0–4 league win over Taranto.

At the end of the season, in May 2017, he signed his first professional contract with Ascoli, penning a three-year deal.

Return to Ascoli 
On 28 October 2017, Parlati made his debut for Ascoli, starting and playing 90 minutes in a 3–0 Serie B defeat to Bari. On 4 November, he scored his first goal for the club in a 4–2 league defeat to Carpi.

In the evening of 11 March 2018, following a 1–0 league loss to Venezia, he was attacked and threatened, together with team-mate Vincenzo Venditti, by a group of Ascoli ultras. Both the players received support from the AIC, as well as local authorities, including Bishop of Ascoli Piceno .

Bisceglie (loan) 
Having found limited game time at Ascoli, on 10 January 2019 Parlati joined Serie C side Bisceglie on loan until the end of the 2018–19 season. The club would eventually get relegated to Serie D, after losing the last play-out match to Lucchese on penalties.

Fano and Catanzaro 
On 26 July 2019, he joined fellow third-tier club Fano on a permanent deal, signing a two-year contract. Since the 2019–20 season was cut short due to the COVID-19 pandemic, his side was involved in a relegation play-off against Ravenna: Parlati scored in the first leg, which was won by Fano (2–0), as the team went on to win the second leg, as well (0–1), thus avoiding relegation from the third tier.

On 1 February 2021, Parlati joined Serie C side Catanzaro on a permanent deal, as part of a swap deal that saw Francesco Urso go in the opposite direction. He went on to make his debut for the club on 7 March, coming on as a substitute during the second half of a goalless league draw against Teramo.

Monterosi 
On 27 July 2021, he signed permanently for newly-promoted Serie C side Monterosi. He then made his debut for the club on 28 August, starting in a goalless league draw against Foggia, which was his side's first ever game in a professional league. In his first league campaign at the club, Monterosi reached the promotional play-offs, although they got eliminated in the first round, following a 2–2 draw with Virtus Francavilla, which went through due to their better ranking in the regular season.

Having featured regularly in his first two seasons at Monterosi, Parlati extended his contract with the club in January 2023, signing a new deal until 2026. On 12 February of the same year, in the injury time of a league match against Giugliano, the midfielder volunteered to play in goal, after goalkeeper Marco Alia had been sent-off; he managed both to save the subsequent penalty kick by Francesco Salvemini and keep a clean sheet, as his side eventually gained a 2–0 victory through a last-minute goal by Filippo Tolomello. In the process, Parlati became one of the few outfield players to ever have saved a penalty while playing in goal, following the likes of Fábio Bilica, David Di Michele and Felipe Melo.

International career 
In 2011, Parlati took part in a training camp with the staff of the Italian under-15 national team.

Career statistics

Club

References

External links
 
 
 

1997 births
People from Gallipoli, Apulia
Footballers from Apulia
Living people
Italian footballers
U.S. Lecce players
Ascoli Calcio 1898 F.C. players
Paganese Calcio 1926 players
A.S. Bisceglie Calcio 1913 players
Alma Juventus Fano 1906 players
U.S. Catanzaro 1929 players
Monterosi Tuscia F.C. players
Serie B players
Serie C players
Association football midfielders
Sportspeople from the Province of Lecce
21st-century Italian people
Outfield association footballers who played in goal